Malaya Kudara (Baga Khüderi) is a rural locality (a selo) in Kyakhtinsky District, Republic of Buryatia, Russia. The population was 278 as of 2010. There are 5 streets.

Geography 
Malaya Kudara is located 114 km southeast of Kyakhta (the district's administrative centre) by road. Ulady is the nearest rural locality.

References 

Rural localities in Kyakhtinsky District